The 2022–23 North Alabama Lions men's basketball team represented the University of North Alabama in the 2022–23 NCAA Division I men's basketball season. The Lions, led by fifth-year head coach Tony Pujol, play their home games at Flowers Hall in Florence, Alabama, as members of the West division of the ASUN Conference. They finished the season 18–13, 10–8 in ASUN play to finish in sixth place. They lost to Eastern Kentucky in the first round of the ASUN tournament.

The Lions received an invitation to play in the 2023 College Basketball Invitational (CBI), where they were defeated in the first round by Southern Utah, closing their season with an overall record of 18–15.

Previous season
The Lions finished the season 9–21, 2–14 in ASUN play to finish in last place in the West Division. They lost to Florida Gulf Coast in the first round of the ASUN tournament.

Roster

Schedule and results

|-
!colspan=9 style=| Non-conference regular season

|-
!colspan=9 style=| ASUN Conference regular season

|-
!colspan=12 style=| ASUN tournament

|-
!colspan=12 style=| College Basketball Invitational

|-

Source

References

North Alabama Lions men's basketball seasons
North Alabama
North Alabama
North Alabama Lions men's basketball
North Alabama Lions men's basketball